Bhediya is a 2022 Indian Hindi-language comedy horror film directed by Amar Kaushik. Produced by Dinesh Vijan, it stars Varun Dhawan and Kriti Sanon. It is the third installment in Vijan's horror-comedy universe.

It was released on 25 November 2022 to positive reviews.

Plot 
Bhaskar and his cousin, Janardhan "Jana", visit a small town in Arunachal Pradesh, as part of a development project to construct roads in the area. They make acquaintance with two locals, Jomin and Panda, who guide them around. One night, Bhaskar is chased and bitten by a wolf in the forest. Jana and Jomin immediately take him to Dr. Anika, who happens to be the local veterinarian. Seeing the huge bite mark on Bhaskar's rear end and him being in immense pain, she gives him an injection, hoping it would alleviate his pain. 

The next day, Bhaskar starts experiencing changes within him. He experiences a heightened sense of smell and hearing, whilst also communicating with animals. Meanwhile, the local people and tribals are against the idea of cutting down trees in the forests to construct roads and refuse to support it. However, Bhaskar manages to get support of the youth and they give their agreement for the project. Soon, two men who were a part of the project, are found dead. The scratch and bite marks on their body suggest that they might have been mauled and killed by an animal. Panda says that a shape-shifting werewolf is behind the killings, but nobody believes him. 

Seeing Bhaskar's increasingly strange behavior, Jana suspects that Bhaskar might be the shape-shifting werewolf. Jana and Jomin secretly acquire some of Bhaskar's stools to conduct a stool test and find that fragments of human bones were found in Bhaskar's stools. It is revealed that Bhaskar is indeed the one behind the killings, as he reveals the truth to them that ever since he was bitten by the wolf, he has been transforming into a werewolf, every night, and that he has no control over it. 

They decide to lock Bhaskar up at an isolated place so that he does not fall prey to his own urges. However, a local cop spots them and hears the truth, saying that he will reveal Bhaskar's identity to everyone. Just then, the wolf which had bitten Bhaskar, appears and kills the cop, allowing them to escape. In order to find a cure for Bhaskar's condition, they visit an aged medical practitioner. He tells them that the only way Bhaskar can be cured of his transformation is to get bitten again by the same wolf, on a new moon night, at the exact same spot as before.

Bhaskar wears protective gear all over his body, except his rear end, where he needs to get bitten by the wolf, and goes to the forest, along with Jana and Jomin, waiting for the wolf to appear. The wolf appears and they are shocked to see that the wolf is none other than Dr. Anika, who is also a shape-shifter. She reveals that she had been bitten by the wolf around a hundred years ago. Since then, she had been the protector of the forest, killing anyone who tries to destroy the forest and its trees. She had bitten Bhaskar intending to kill him, but spared him, sensing goodness inside him. She advices him to not fall prey to deforestation and its rewards.

Anika, suddenly, is shot down and captured by the local police force. Bhaskar transforms into a werewolf and rescues Anika, killing the policemen. However, Anika succumbs to her injuries and falls of a cliff, leaving Bhaskar heartbroken. He decides to work on constructing the roads, but around the borders of the forest, leaving the trees unharmed. 

In a mid-credits scene, Vicky and Bittu come to meet their long lost friend, Jana, who had previously been possessed by Stree, and has since been staying far away from them, cutting off all contacts. They request Jana's help in uncovering the mystery of Stree. Suddenly, Bhaskar transforms into the werewolf and appears in front of them, leaving them terrified.

Cast 
 Varun Dhawan as Bhaskar Sharma
 Kriti Sanon as Dr. Anika
 Deepak Dobriyal as Panda
 Abhishek Banerjee as Janardan "Jana"; Banerjee reprises his role from Stree (2018)
 Saurabh Shukla as Bagga
 Baharul Islam as Neli
 Paalin Kabak as Jomin
 Dosam Beyong as Prakash
 Mudang Pai as Ojha Myran
 Tai Tugung as Police inspector
 K4Kekho as one of the youths
 Ngilyang Aka as one of the youths
 Ligang Sallu as Range Forest Officer
 Nani Haniya as Head Gaon Burah

Special appearances 
 Shraddha Kapoor in the song "Thumkeshwari"; Kapoor reprises her role from Stree
 Rajkummar Rao as Vicky: Jana and Bittu's friend, Rao reprises his role from Stree
 Aparshakti Khurana as Bittu: Jana and Vicky's friend, Khurana reprises his role from Stree
 Sharad Kelkar as Anika's father

Production
The producer of film, Dinesh Vijan, confirmed that Bhediya is part of his horror comedy universe consisting of films like Stree, Roohi and Munjha. Munjha will be the prequel to 2018 film Stree. The shooting for Bhediya is done in the regions of Arunachal Pradesh's Ziro (Lower Subansiri), Sagalee (Papum Pare) and parts of Pakke-Kessang district- over a span of two months, from March to April 2021.  Over 70 percent of the artists in Bhediya are from Arunachal Pradesh, including a lead character, named Jomin. Besides that, Arunachal rapper K4 Kheko will also feature in the film. He has also sung and written the lyrics for the theme song of the film.

During the shooting schedule, Varun Dhawan and his wife, designer Natasha Dalal donated  to the victims of a massive fire in Arunachal Pradesh's Tirap and Longding districts in April 2021. Chief Minister of Arunachal Pradesh, Pema Khandu also visited the set in Ziro. The shooting schedule in Arunachal Pradesh completed on 19 April 2021. The film was wrapped up on 10 July 2021.

Soundtrack 

The music of the film is composed by Sachin-Jigar while the lyrics are written by Amitabh Bhattacharya. The first single titled "Thumkeshwari" was released on 28 October 2022. The second single audio titled "Apna Bana Le will release on 5 November 2022 while it's video was released on 7 November 2022.

Release
The film was released theatrically on 25 November 2022 along with dubbed versions in Telugu (titled Thodelu) and Tamil (titled Onai).

Reception 
Bhediya received positive reviews from critics. Amandeep Naang of ABP News rated the film 4 out of 5 stars and wrote "Bhediya is a mad ride of a horror-comedy which feels different in the current climate of remakes, thrillers and period dramas". Siby Jeyya of India Herald rated the film 4 out of 5 stars and wrote "The impact of the film's visuals is by far its most noteworthy aspect. The vfx are incredible, and cinematographer Jishnu Bhattacharjee has masterfully captured the dark and fascinating realm of werewolves with the backdrop of the full moon in the midnight sky, ziro jungles, and mountains". Bollywood Hungama rated the film 3.5 out of 5 stars and wrote "Bhediya works due to its novel idea, memorable performances, captivating climax, and VFX". Dhaval Roy of The Times of India rated the film 3.5 stars out of 5 and wrote " Director Amar Kaushik handles both genres skillfully in his latest outing and strikes a fine balance to deliver a movie that’s spine chilling in some instances, rib-tickling in almost all, and leaves you with something to think about." Tushar Joshi of India Today rated the film 3.5 out of 5 stars and wrote "Performances feel genuine and Kaushik’s USP of infusing humour and wit at the right moments helps in keeping the narrative engaging and entertaining". Saibal Chatterjee of NDTV rated the film 3.5 out of 5 stars and wrote "Bhediya is both enjoyable and thought-provoking, is helped along by lively performances. Varun Dhawan gives the unconventional role his best shot. Abhishek Banerjee and Paalin Kabak are terrific as much with their comic timing as with their dramatic flourishes".  Devesh Sharma of Filmfare rated the film 3.5 out of 5 stars and wrote "The film’s creature effects and computer generated imagery is excellent. Cinematography and the background score are good as well".Shubhra Gupta of The Indian Express rated the film 3 out of 5 stars and wrote "Varun Dhawan does a good job of aligning with the tone of the film-- the horror is pretty much ‘naam-ke-vaaste’, comedy is what it is interested in and does it well". Rohit Bhatnagar of The Free Press Journal rated the film 3 out of 5 stars and wrote "Bhediya is a good one-time popcorn entertainment and a decent distraction from the monotony". Sonil Dedhia of News 18 rated the film 3 out of 5 stars and wrote "Bhediya has a message that resonates with current times. The film has its heart in the right place but it falters in its execution and writing". Sukanya Verma of Rediff rated the film 3 out of 5 stars and wrote "Varun Dhawan ups his entertainer game exponentially in Bhediya". 

In a less positive review, Anna M. M. Vetticad of Firstpost rated it 2.5 out of 5 stars and wrote, “Bhediya is not the first film in this world to sideline characters from social groups sidelined in reality, even while purportedly being about those communities... All the noble intentions in the world and even Abhishek Banerjee’s comedic genius cannot compensate for such mindlessness.” Himesh Mankad of Pinkvilla rated the film 3 out of 5 stars and wrote "Bhediya rides primarily on the strength of gags, visual effects, and performances, but warranted a bigger conflict with regard to a hero and villain in the second half". Umesh Punwani of Koimoi rated the film 3 out of 5 stars and wrote "You'll come in for Varun Dhawan, but will stay back for Abhishek Banerjee"

Rahul Desai from Film Companion wrote: "Bhediya is silly, stylish – and surprisingly poignant"

See also 
 The Wolf Man (franchise)
 Dinesh Vijan's horror-comedy universe
 Stree
 Roohi

References

External links 
 
 

Films shot in Arunachal Pradesh
Indian romantic horror films
2020s Hindi-language films
2022 comedy horror films
Werewolf films
Indian comedy horror films
Indian 3D films